SEC Football Legends is an annual award program of the Southeastern Conference designed to honor outstanding former college football players from each of the conference's fourteen member institutions. Begun in 1994, the Legends Dinner featuring video highlights of each honoree's career is one of various events of the week leading up to the SEC Championship Game. The honorees are also recognized at halftime of the game.

SEC Legends honorees

Eastern Division

Western Division

 2020:

 2021: 

 2022: Ozzie Newsome, Steve Korte, Ben Tamburello, Alex Brown, Thomas Davis, Joe Federspiel, Todd McClure, Eli Manning, K.J. Wright, Gary Pinkel, Alshon Jeffery, Peyton Manning, Johnny Manziel, Allama Matthews.

References

Southeastern Conference football